Dalnerechensky District is an administrative and municipal district (raion), one of the twenty-two in Primorsky Krai, Russia. It is located in the central and western parts of the krai. Its administrative center is the town of Dalnerechensk (which is not administratively a part of the district). Population:

History
The district was established in 1926 as Imansky District. It was renamed Dalnerechensky in 1972.

Administrative and municipal status
Within the framework of administrative divisions, Dalnerechensky District is one of the twenty-two in the krai. The town of Dalnerechensk serves as its administrative center, despite being incorporated separately as a town under krai jurisdiction—an administrative unit with the status equal to that of the districts.

As a municipal division, the district is incorporated as Dalnerechensky Municipal District. Dalnerechensk Town Under Krai Jurisdiction is incorporated separately from the district as Dalnerechensky Urban Okrug.

References

Notes

Sources

Districts of Primorsky Krai